Breast Cancer Haven is a charity in the United Kingdom. Founded in 2000 by Sara Davenport, it used to run centres in London, Hereford, Yorkshire, Wessex and West Midlands. Its Leeds branch was opened by singer Kimberley Walsh, who is an ambassador for the charity.

As of the 30 June 2021 Breast Cancer Haven suspended all live services after all staff members were made redundant. However, the charity still provided information, videos and audio support via their website.

Sadly, on 10 February 2023, the charity closed but their self-help resources remain on their website and YouTube.

References

External links

Health charities in the United Kingdom
Breast cancer organizations